The Irregulars is a British mystery adventure crime drama streaming television series created by Tom Bidwell for Netflix. Based on the works of Sir Arthur Conan Doyle, it features the Baker Street Irregulars working for Dr. Watson saving London from supernatural elements.

Developed by Drama Republic, the eight-episode series premiered on 26 March 2021. In May 2021, the series was canceled after one season.

Premise
A group of teenagers living on the streets of Victorian London known as the Irregulars work for John Watson to solve increasingly supernatural crimes, while they search for Sherlock Holmes.

Cast

The Irregulars 
 Thaddea Graham as Bea, leader of the Irregulars. She is described as headstrong, fierce, and protective of her peers and her younger sister. She is 17 years old.
 McKell David as Spike, described as "fast-talking charmer", and "dashing". He keeps the group together with common sense and humour. He is 16 years old.
 Jojo Macari as Billy, the muscle of the group. He has a short fuse and tends to settle things with physical fights, He met Bea & Jessie in the workhouse when they were children. He is 16 years old.
 Harrison Osterfield as Leopold, a prince who has haemophilia and who has lived a rather sheltered life. He befriends Bea and the Irregulars and joins them on their adventures, providing resourcefulness and knowledge. He is based on Prince Leopold, Duke of Albany, Queen Victoria's youngest son. He is 17 years old.
 Darci Shaw as Jessie, Bea's younger sister who has nightmares, and then is able to view and show the memories of the people she touches. She is 15 years old.

Recurring 
 Clarke Peters as the Linen Man, a series original character who interacts with the Irregulars using their dreams. He claims to be from Louisiana and wants the Irregulars to keep tracking down the criminals and report to him on their supernatural powers.
 Royce Pierreson as John Watson,  a resident of Baker Street who hires Bea and the Irregulars.
 Edward Hogg as Daimler, Leopold's footman.
 Ian Whyte as Plague Doctor, a masked character who haunts Jessie in her nightmares.
 Alex Ferns as Vic Collins,  the abusive taskmaster of the workhouse where some of the Irregulars used to be.
 Nell Hudson as Louise, Leo's older sister, a princess and daughter of Queen Victoria and Prince Albert.
 Henry Lloyd-Hughes as Sherlock Holmes, a private detective who "appears to be a shadow of his former self".
 Eileen O'Higgins as Alice, the deceased mother of Bea and Jessie

Guest 
 Rory McCann as the Bird Master / Arthur Hilton, an ornithologist who acquired the ability to control birds.
 Lisa Dwyer Hogg as Sister Anna, a nun who presides over the churchyard where Bea and Jessie's mother's grave lies. 
 Charles Armstrong as Mr. Bannister, Mycroft's assistant
 Jonjo O'Neill as Mycroft Holmes, Sherlock's brother, in charge of a government organisation on the paranormal.
 Sheila Atim as the Tooth Fairy 
 Olivia Grant as Patricia Coleman Jones, a participant in the order of the Golden Dawn.
 Aidan McArdle as Inspector Lestrade 
 Tim Key as Gregson, a Scotland Yard inspector

Episodes

Production

Development
On 20 December 2018, it was announced that Netflix was planning a series with Tom Bidwell based on the Baker Street Irregulars. Tom Bidwell (who had directed Netflix's Watership Down) described the program as "my dream project and my oldest idea" and it takes a different view of Holmes and his relationship to the Irregulars.

Bidwell will serve as executive producer alongside Jude Liknaitzky and Greg Brenman. Directors for the series have been announced as Endeavour’s Johnny Allan as lead director with Joss Agnew and Weronika Tofilska also directing.

Casting
In December 2019 the cast was announced as Henry Lloyd-Hughes in the role of Sherlock, Royce Pierreson as Doctor Watson, and Clarke Peters as Linen Man, Thaddea Graham as Bea, Darci Shaw as Jessie, Jojo Marcari as Billy, McKell David as Spike, and Harrison Osterfield as Leopold. In September, 2020 it was announced that Aidan McArdle had joined the cast in the role of Inspector Lestrade along with Olivia Grant as Patricia Coleman-Jones. In December, 2020 Sheila Atim was also credited as having an unknown role.

Filming
The series was announced to be filmed in the UK, with reports In early December 2019 that filming had taken place in Nantwich at Dorfold Hall. Filming took place in Liverpool and the Wirral in late 2019 and early 2020, making use of several locations including St George's Plateau, the palm house in Sefton Park, Falkner Street in the Georgian Quarter and the Grand Entrance at Birkenhead Park.

Filming was temporarily disrupted in January 2020 when a cast member was injured on set on Liverpool's Ormond Street. Filming took place in Chester towards the end of January 2020, in Abbey Square, next to Chester Cathedral and also in the city's suburb of Hoole. Production then went to North Wales in March.

Filming resumed in August 2020, starting with scenes in Ellesmere Port that were intended to be filmed in March.

On 31 March 2021, Esquire magazine reported that the second season was scheduled to film in Liverpool during the summer of 2021. However, on 4 May 2021, Netflix announced that they had cancelled the show for undisclosed reasons.

Release
On 22 February 2021 Netflix released the first teaser trailer for series. The eight-episode series premiered on Netflix on 26 March 2021.

Reception

On Rotten Tomatoes, the series holds an approval rating of 80% based on 40 critic reviews. The website's critics consensus reads, "It taps into some fairly regular plot points, but when it dares to defy expectations and focus on its charming young cast, The Irregulars hints at something truly special lingering beneath the surface." Metacritic reported a weighted average score for the series of 60 out of 100 based on 12 critic reviews, indicating "mixed or average reviews".

It was ranked second on the Top “Shows on the Rise” Week Ended March 28 list by Rise Ratio. The show managed to top Nielsen's Original Streaming Shows Charts, beating out Disney+'s The Falcon and The Winter Soldier.

References

External links
 
 

2021 British television series debuts
2021 British television series endings
2020s British drama television series
2020s British mystery television series
Adventure television series
British thriller television series
English-language Netflix original programming
Sherlock Holmes television series
Television series about teenagers 
Television shows shot in Liverpool